Lulzacite is a strontium-containing phosphate mineral with the chemical formula Sr2Fe2+(Fe2+,Mg)2Al4(PO4)4(OH)10.

The mineral was first described in 2000 from quartzite deposits at Saint-Aubin-des-Châteaux, Loire-Atlantique, France, and is named after Y. Lulzac, a French geologist who discovered the mineral. In this deposit, lulzacite occurs within quartz and siderite veinlets at quartzite–limestone contacts. Other minerals found in the veinlets include apatite, goyazite, and pyrite.

Lulzacite crystallizes in the triclinic system with P space group. It is isostructural with jamesite (Pb2Zn(Fe2+,Zn)2Fe3+4(AsO4)4(OH)10).

References

Phosphate minerals
Strontium minerals
Iron(II) minerals
Magnesium minerals
Aluminium minerals
Triclinic minerals
Minerals in space group 2